The Gibson Les Paul Special is a variation of the Gibson Les Paul guitar. It was introduced in 1955. It is designed to be an intermediate level instrument, at a price point and trim level between the low-cost Les Paul Junior and the standard Les Paul.

Overview
Like most of Gibson's other budget models, the Les Paul Special was produced in a TV Yellow finish, which was made by Gibson as a finish that would look good on black and white television. It featured a  In 1958, the model received a major change when it was introduced as a doublecut model instead of the traditional singlecut.

In 1961, the Les Paul received a drastic change when it was redesigned into what would become known as the Gibson SG. Les Paul's contract had expired by 1963, bringing a change to the submodels. When the contract was renewed in 1968, the original models were rebooted.

Models

The list of Special models manufactured since 1955.

Single Cutaway

 1955–1958: Les Paul Special (Single Cutaway)
 1974: Les Paul '55 Special limited edition
 1974/1977/(1978)–1981: Les Paul '55 (Special Single Cutaway Reissue)
 1989–1998: Les Paul Junior II (Les Paul Special Single Cutaway Reissue)
 2019–present: Les Paul Special (reissue with wrap tailpiece; vintage cherry and TV yellow finishes)
variations
 1996–1999: Les Paul Special SL
 1999–2003: Les Paul Junior Special
 2001–2005: Les Paul Junior Special Plus
 2001–2002: Les Paul Junior Special With Humbucker
 2003–(2005): Les Paul Special Faded With Humbucker
 2003–2006: Les Paul Junior Special Faded With Humbucker
 2006–2008: Les Paul Special New Century
 2009–2011: Les Paul Junior Special Robot
 2011: Les Paul Special Humbucker
 2012–2013: Les Paul Junior Special Humbucker
 2012–2013: Les Paul Junior Special P-90
 2014: Les Paul Special AAA Flame Top Semi-Hollowbody

Double Cutaway

 1958–/1959	Les Paul Special (Double Cutaway)
 1959: Les Paul Special 3/4 (Double Cutaway)
 1959–1961: SG Special (Les Paul Special Double Cutaway)
 1976–1989: Les Paul Special Double Cutaway (1st Reissue)
 1993–1995: Les Paul Special Double Cutaway (2nd Reissue)
 2015: Les Paul Special Double Cutaway 2015
variations
 1994: Centennial Les Paul Special Double Cutaway
 1999–2002: Les Paul Junior Lite
 2003–2008: Les Paul Faded Double Cutaway

Timeline

References

Bibliography

External links

Special
Les Paul Special